Sir John Hales (1603 – 1639) was an English courtier and politician who sat in the House of Commons from 1628 to 1629.

Hales was the son of Charles Hales of Newland of Coventry, Warwickshire. He was a student of Gray's Inn in 1600 and matriculated at University College, Oxford on 13 February 1601, aged 16. He was knighted on 17 July 1617 and was a gentleman pensioner to King James. In 1628, he was elected Member of Parliament for Queenborough and sat until 1629 when King Charles decided to rule without parliament for eleven years. 
 
Hales died at the age of about 36. He was of Tunstall, Kent.

References

1603 births
1639 deaths
English MPs 1628–1629
Members of Gray's Inn
Alumni of University College, Oxford